The Yemeni Red Sea Ports Corporation (YRSPC) is a governmental institution that is responsible for managing Yemeni ports in the Red Sea.

History 
The YRSPC was established in 2007 by Republican Decree No. 63 of 2007 to manage key Yemeni ports and harbors in Hudeidah governorate, mainly Port of Hudaydah, Port of Mokha, and al-Salif Port.

See also 

 Yemen Gulf of Aden Ports Corporation
 Yemen Arabian Sea Ports Corporation
 Hudaydah Port
 Transport in Yemen

References

External links 

Transport in Yemen
Ports and harbours of Yemen
2007 establishments in Yemen